Iona Church is an historic church in Port Chalmers, New Zealand. The church building is listed as a Category I Historic Place.

History 
Iona church was designed to replace an earlier wooden church. The new stone church was designed by Nathaniel Wales. The foundation stone was laid in 1871 and the building was opened on 7 January 1872. As a result of a growing congregation an additional gallery was added between 1882 and 1883. The new gallery became the main church and the original church building became the church hall.

Current use 
Iona Church is open for special services, concerts and the summer cruise ship season.

References

Further reading

External links 

Heritage New Zealand Category 1 historic places in Otago
Churches in Dunedin
Presbyterian churches in New Zealand
Port Chalmers
Listed churches in New Zealand
1870s architecture in New Zealand
Gothic Revival church buildings in New Zealand
Stone churches in New Zealand